A bridge is a structure built to span a physical obstacle (such as a body of water, valley, road, or rail) without blocking the way underneath. It is constructed for the purpose of providing passage over the obstacle, which is usually something that is otherwise difficult or impossible to cross. There are many different designs of bridges, each serving a particular purpose and applicable to different situations. Designs of bridges vary depending on factors such as the function of the bridge, the nature of the terrain where the bridge is constructed and anchored, and the material used to make it, and the funds available to build it.

The earliest bridges were likely made with fallen trees and stepping stones. The Neolithic people built boardwalk bridges across marshland. The Arkadiko Bridge (dating from the 13th century BC, in the Peloponnese) is one of the oldest arch bridges still in existence and use.

Etymology

The Oxford English Dictionary traces the origin of the word bridge to an Old English word brycg, of the same meaning. The word can be traced directly back to Proto-Indo-European *bʰrēw-. The origin of the word for the card game of the same name is unknown.

History

The simplest and earliest types of bridges were stepping stones. Neolithic people also built a form of boardwalk across marshes; examples of such bridges include the Sweet Track and the Post Track in England, approximately 6000 years old. Undoubtedly, ancient people would also have used log bridges; that is a timber bridge that fall naturally or are intentionally felled or placed across streams. Some of the first man-made bridges with significant span were probably intentionally felled trees.

Among the oldest timber bridges is the Holzbrücke Rapperswil-Hurden crossing upper Lake Zürich in Switzerland; the prehistoric timber piles discovered to the west of the Seedamm date back to 1523 BC. The first wooden footbridge led across Lake Zürich, followed by several reconstructions at least until the late 2nd century AD, when the Roman Empire built a  wooden bridge. On April 6, 2001, the reconstructed wooden footbridge was opened, being the longest wooden bridge in Switzerland.

The Arkadiko Bridge is one of four Mycenaean corbel arch bridges part of a former network of roads, designed to accommodate chariots, between the fort of Tiryns and town of Epidauros in the Peloponnese, in southern Greece. Dating to the Greek Bronze Age (13th century BC), it is one of the oldest arch bridges still in existence and use. Several intact arched stone bridges from the Hellenistic era can be found in the Peloponnese.

The greatest bridge builders of antiquity were the ancient Romans. The Romans built arch bridges and aqueducts that could stand in conditions that would damage or destroy earlier designs. Some stand today. An example is the Alcántara Bridge, built over the river Tagus, in Spain. The Romans also used cement, which reduced the variation of strength found in natural stone. One type of cement, called pozzolana, consisted of water, lime, sand, and volcanic rock. Brick and mortar bridges were built after the Roman era, as the technology for cement was lost (then later rediscovered).

In India, the Arthashastra treatise by Kautilya mentions the construction of dams and bridges. A Mauryan bridge near Girnar was surveyed by James Princep. The bridge was swept away during a flood, and later repaired by Puspagupta, the chief architect of emperor Chandragupta I. The use of stronger bridges using plaited bamboo and iron chain was visible in India by about the 4th century. A number of bridges, both for military and commercial purposes, were constructed by the Mughal administration in India.

Although large Chinese bridges of wooden construction existed at the time of the Warring States period, the oldest surviving stone bridge in China is the Zhaozhou Bridge, built from 595 to 605 AD during the Sui dynasty. This bridge is also historically significant as it is the world's oldest open-spandrel stone segmental arch bridge. European segmental arch bridges date back to at least the Alconétar Bridge (approximately 2nd century AD), while the enormous Roman era Trajan's Bridge (105 AD) featured open-spandrel segmental arches in wooden construction.

Rope bridges, a simple type of suspension bridge, were used by the Inca civilization in the Andes mountains of South America, just prior to European colonization in the 16th century.

The Ashanti built bridges over streams and rivers. They were constructed by pounding four large forked tree trunks into the stream bed, placing beams along these forked pillars, then positioning cross-beams that were finally covered with four to six inches of dirt.

During the 18th century, there were many innovations in the design of timber bridges by Hans Ulrich Grubenmann, Johannes Grubenmann, and others. The first book on bridge engineering was written by Hubert Gautier in 1716.

A major breakthrough in bridge technology came with the erection of the Iron Bridge in Shropshire, England in 1779. It used cast iron for the first time as arches to cross the river Severn. With the Industrial Revolution in the 19th century, truss systems of wrought iron were developed for larger bridges, but iron does not have the tensile strength to support large loads. With the advent of steel, which has a high tensile strength, much larger bridges were built, many using the ideas of Gustave Eiffel.

In Canada and the United States, numerous timber covered bridges were built in the late 1700s to the late 1800s, reminiscent of earlier designs in Germany and Switzerland. Some covered bridges were also built in Asia. In later years, some were partly made of stone or metal but the trusses were usually still made of wood; in the United States, there were three styles of trusses, the Queen Post, the Burr Arch and the Town Lattice. Hundreds of these structures still stand in North America. They were brought to the attention of the general public in the 1990s by the novel, movie, and play The Bridges of Madison County.

In 1927 welding pioneer Stefan Bryła designed the first welded road bridge in the world, the Maurzyce Bridge which was later built across the river Słudwia at Maurzyce near Łowicz, Poland in 1929. In 1995, the American Welding Society presented the Historic Welded Structure Award for the bridge to Poland.

Types of bridges
Bridges can be categorized in several different ways. Common categories include the type of structural elements used, by what they carry, whether they are fixed or movable, and by the materials used.

Structure types
Bridges may be classified by how the actions of tension, compression, bending, torsion and shear are distributed through their structure. Most bridges will employ all of these to some degree, but only a few will predominate. The separation of forces and moments may be quite clear. In a suspension or cable-stayed bridge, the elements in tension are distinct in shape and placement. In other cases the forces may be distributed among a large number of members, as in a truss.

Some Engineers sub-divide 'beam' bridges into slab, beam-and-slab and box girder on the basis of their cross-section. A slab can be solid or voided (though this is no longer favored for inspectability reasons) while beam-and-slab consists of concrete or steel girders connected by a concrete slab. A box-girder cross-section consists of a single-cell or multi-cellular box. In recent years, integral bridge construction has also become popular.

Fixed or movable bridges

Most bridges are fixed bridges, meaning they have no moving parts and stay in one place until they fail or are demolished. Temporary bridges, such as Bailey bridges, are designed to be assembled, taken apart, transported to a different site, and re-used. They are important in military engineering and are also used to carry traffic while an old bridge is being rebuilt. Movable bridges are designed to move out of the way of boats or other kinds of traffic, which would otherwise be too tall to fit. These are generally electrically powered.

The Tank bridge transporter (TBT) has the same cross-country performance as a tank even when fully loaded. It can deploy, drop off and load bridges independently, but it cannot recover them.

Double-decked bridges

Double-decked (or double-decker) bridges have two levels, such as the George Washington Bridge, connecting New York City to Bergen County, New Jersey, US, as the world's busiest bridge, carrying 102 million vehicles annually; truss work between the roadway levels provided stiffness to the roadways and reduced movement of the upper level when the lower level was installed three decades after the upper level. The Tsing Ma Bridge and Kap Shui Mun Bridge in Hong Kong have six lanes on their upper decks, and on their lower decks there are two lanes and a pair of tracks for MTR metro trains. Some double-decked bridges only use one level for street traffic; the Washington Avenue Bridge in Minneapolis reserves its lower level for automobile and light rail traffic and its upper level for pedestrian and bicycle traffic (predominantly students at the University of Minnesota). Likewise, in Toronto, the Prince Edward Viaduct has five lanes of motor traffic, bicycle lanes, and sidewalks on its upper deck; and a pair of tracks for the Bloor–Danforth subway line on its lower deck. The western span of the San Francisco–Oakland Bay Bridge also has two levels.

Robert Stephenson's High Level Bridge across the River Tyne in Newcastle upon Tyne, completed in 1849, is an early example of a double-decked bridge. The upper level carries a railway, and the lower level is used for road traffic. Other examples include Britannia Bridge over the Menai Strait and Craigavon Bridge in Derry, Northern Ireland. The Oresund Bridge between Copenhagen and Malmö consists of a four-lane highway on the upper level and a pair of railway tracks at the lower level. Tower Bridge in London is different example of a double-decked bridge, with the central section consisting of a low-level bascule span and a high-level footbridge.

Viaducts

A viaduct is made up of multiple bridges connected into one longer structure. The longest and some of the highest bridges are viaducts, such as the Lake Pontchartrain Causeway and Millau Viaduct.

Multi-way bridge

A multi-way bridge has three or more separate spans which meet near the center of the bridge. Multi-way bridges with only three spans appear as a "T" or "Y" when viewed from above. Multi-way bridges are extremely rare. The Tridge, Margaret Bridge, and Zanesville Y-Bridge are examples.

Bridge types by use
A bridge can be categorized by what it is designed to carry, such as trains, pedestrian or road traffic (road bridge), a pipeline or waterway for water transport or barge traffic. An aqueduct is a bridge that carries water, resembling a viaduct, which is a bridge that connects points of equal height. A road-rail bridge carries both road and rail traffic. Overway is a term for a bridge that separates incompatible intersecting traffic, especially road and rail. A bridge can carry overhead power lines as does the Storstrøm Bridge.

Some bridges accommodate other purposes, such as the tower of Nový Most Bridge in Bratislava, which features a restaurant, or a bridge-restaurant which is a bridge built to serve as a restaurant. Other suspension bridge towers carry transmission antennas.

Conservationists use wildlife overpasses to reduce habitat fragmentation and animal-vehicle collisions. The first animal bridges sprung up in France in the 1950s, and these types of bridges are now used worldwide to protect both large and small wildlife.

Bridges are subject to unplanned uses as well. The areas underneath some bridges have become makeshift shelters and homes to homeless people, and the undertimbers of bridges all around the world are spots of prevalent graffiti. Some bridges attract people attempting suicide, and become known as suicide bridges.

Bridge types by material

The materials used to build the structure are also used to categorize bridges. Until the end of the 18th century, bridges were made out of timber, stone and masonry. Modern bridges are currently built in concrete, steel, fiber reinforced polymers (FRP), stainless steel or combinations of those materials. Living bridges have been constructed of live plants such as Ficus elastica tree roots in India and wisteria vines in Japan.

Analysis and design 

Unlike buildings whose design is led by architects, bridges are usually designed by engineers. This follows from the importance of the engineering requirements; namely spanning the obstacle and having the durability to survive, with minimal maintenance, in an aggressive outdoor environment. Bridges are first analysed; the bending moment and shear force distributions are calculated due to the applied loads. For this, the finite element method is the most popular. The analysis can be one-, two-, or three-dimensional. For the majority of bridges, a two-dimensional plate model (often with stiffening beams) is sufficient or an upstand finite element model. On completion of the analysis, the bridge is designed to resist the applied bending moments and shear forces, section sizes are selected with sufficient capacity to resist the stresses. Many bridges are made of prestressed concrete which has good durability properties, either by pre-tensioning of beams prior to installation or post-tensioning on site.

In most countries, bridges, like other structures, are designed according to Load and Resistance Factor Design (LRFD) principles. In simple terms, this means that the load is factored up by a factor greater than unity, while the resistance or capacity of the structure is factored down, by a factor less than unity. The effect of the factored load (stress, bending moment) should be less than the factored resistance to that effect. Both of these factors allow for uncertainty and are greater when the uncertainty is greater.

Aesthetics

Most bridges are utilitarian in appearance, but in some cases, the appearance of the bridge can have great importance. Often, this is the case with a large bridge that serves as an entrance to a city, or crosses over a main harbor entrance. These are sometimes known as signature bridges. Designers of bridges in parks and along parkways often place more importance on aesthetics, as well. Examples include the stone-faced bridges along the Taconic State Parkway in New York.

Generally bridges are more aesthetically pleasing if they are simple in shape, the deck is thinner (in proportion to its span), the lines of the structure are continuous, and the shapes of the structural elements reflect the forces acting on them. To create a beautiful image, some bridges are built much taller than necessary. This type, often found in east-Asian style gardens, is called a Moon bridge, evoking a rising full moon. Other garden bridges may cross only a dry bed of stream-washed pebbles, intended only to convey an impression of a stream. Often in palaces, a bridge will be built over an artificial waterway as symbolic of a passage to an important place or state of mind. A set of five bridges cross a sinuous waterway in an important courtyard of the Forbidden City in Beijing, China. The central bridge was reserved exclusively for the use of the Emperor and Empress, with their attendants.

Bridge maintenance

The estimated life of bridges varies between 25 and 80 years depending on location and material. However, bridges may age hundred years with proper maintenance and rehabilitation. Bridge maintenance consisting of a combination of structural health monitoring and testing. This is regulated in country-specific engineer standards and includes an ongoing monitoring every three to six months, a simple test or inspection every two to three years and a major inspection every six to ten years. In Europe, the cost of maintenance is considerable and is higher in some countries than spending on new bridges. The lifetime of welded steel bridges can be significantly extended by aftertreatment of the weld transitions. This results in a potential high benefit, using existing bridges far beyond the planned lifetime.

Bridge traffic loading 
While the response of a bridge to the applied loading is well understood, the applied traffic loading itself is still the subject of research. This is a statistical problem as loading is highly variable, particularly for road bridges. Load Effects in bridges (stresses, bending moments) are designed for using the principles of Load and Resistance Factor Design. Before factoring to allow for uncertainty, the load effect is generally considered to be the maximum characteristic value in a specified return period. Notably, in Europe, it is the maximum value expected in 1000 years.

Bridge standards generally include a load model, deemed to represent the characteristic maximum load to be expected in the return period. In the past, these load models were agreed by standard drafting committees of experts but today, this situation is changing. It is now possible to measure the components of bridge traffic load, to weigh trucks, using weigh-in-motion (WIM) technologies. With extensive WIM databases, it is possible to calculate the maximum expected load effect in the specified return period. This is an active area of research, addressing issues of opposing direction lanes, side-by-side (same direction) lanes, traffic growth, permit/non-permit vehicles and long-span bridges (see below). Rather than repeat this complex process every time a bridge is to be designed, standards authorities specify simplified notional load models, notably HL-93, intended to give the same load effects as the characteristic maximum values. The Eurocode is an example of a standard for bridge traffic loading that was developed in this way.

Traffic loading on long span bridges 

Most bridge standards are only applicable for short and medium spans - for example, the Eurocode is only applicable for loaded lengths up to 200 m. Longer spans are dealt with on a case-by-case basis. It is generally accepted that the intensity of load reduces as span increases because the probability of many trucks being closely spaced and extremely heavy reduces as the number of trucks involved increases. It is also generally assumed that short spans are governed by a small number of trucks traveling at high speed, with an allowance for dynamics. Longer spans on the other hand, are governed by congested traffic and no allowance for dynamics is needed. Calculating the loading due to congested traffic remains a challenge as there is a paucity of data on inter-vehicle gaps, both within-lane and inter-lane, in congested conditions. Weigh-in-Motion (WIM) systems provide data on inter-vehicle gaps but only operate well in free flowing traffic conditions. Some authors have used cameras to measure gaps and vehicle lengths in jammed situations and have inferred weights from lengths using WIM data. Others have used microsimulation to generate typical clusters of vehicles on the bridge.

Bridge vibration 
Bridges vibrate under load and this contributes, to a greater or lesser extent, to the stresses. Vibration and dynamics are generally more significant for slender structures such as pedestrian bridges and long-span road or rail bridges. One of the most famous examples is the Tacoma Narrows Bridge that collapsed shortly after being constructed due to excessive vibration. More recently, the Millennium Bridge in London vibrated excessively under pedestrian loading and was closed and retrofitted with a system of dampers. For smaller bridges, dynamics is not catastrophic but can contribute an added amplification to the stresses due to static effects. For example, the Eurocode for bridge loading specifies amplifications of between 10% and 70%, depending on the span, the number of traffic lanes and the type of stress (bending moment or shear force).

Vehicle-bridge dynamic interaction 
There have been many studies of the dynamic interaction between vehicles and bridges during vehicle crossing events. Fryba did pioneering work on the interaction of a moving load and an Euler-Bernoulli beam. With increased computing power, vehicle-bridge interaction (VBI) models have become ever more sophisticated. The concern is that one of the many natural frequencies associated with the vehicle will resonate with the bridge first natural frequency. The vehicle-related frequencies include body bounce and axle hop but there are also pseudo-frequencies associated with the vehicle's speed of crossing and there are many frequencies associated with the surface profile. Given the wide variety of heavy vehicles on road bridges, a statistical approach has been suggested, with VBI analyses carried out for many statically extreme loading events.

Bridge failures

The failure of bridges is of special concern for structural engineers in trying to learn lessons vital to bridge design, construction and maintenance.

The failure of bridges first assumed national interest in Britain during the Victorian era when many new designs were being built, often using new materials, with some of them failing catastrophically.

In the United States, the National Bridge Inventory tracks the structural evaluations of all bridges, including designations such as "structurally deficient" and "functionally obsolete".

Bridge health monitoring
There are several methods used to monitor the condition of large structures like bridges. Many long-span bridges are now routinely monitored with a range of sensors, including strain transducers, accelerometers, tiltmeters, and GPS. Accelerometers have the advantage that they are inertial, i.e., they do not require a reference point to measure from. This is often a problem for distance or deflection measurement, especially if the bridge is over water.  Crowdsourcing bridge conditions by accessing data passively captured by cell phones, which routinely include accelerometers and GPS sensors, has been suggested as an alternative to including sensors during bridge construction and an augment for professional examinations.

An option for structural-integrity monitoring is "non-contact monitoring", which uses the Doppler effect (Doppler shift). A laser beam from a Laser Doppler Vibrometer is directed at the point of interest, and the vibration amplitude and frequency are extracted from the Doppler shift of the laser beam frequency due to the motion of the surface. The advantage of this method is that the setup time for the equipment is faster and, unlike an accelerometer, this makes measurements possible on multiple structures in as short a time as possible. Additionally, this method can measure specific points on a bridge that might be difficult to access. However, vibrometers are relatively expensive and have the disadvantage that a reference point is needed to measure from.

Snapshots in time of the external condition of a bridge can be recorded using Lidar to aid bridge inspection. This can provide measurement of the bridge geometry (to facilitate the building of a computer model) but the accuracy is generally insufficient to measure bridge deflections under load.

While larger modern bridges are routinely monitored electronically, smaller bridges are generally inspected visually by trained inspectors. There is considerable research interest in the challenge of smaller bridges as they are often remote and do not have electrical power on site. Possible solutions are the installation of sensors on a specialist inspection vehicle and the use of its measurements as it drives over the bridge to infer information about the bridge condition. These vehicles can be equipped with accelerometers, gyrometers, Laser Doppler Vibrometers and some even have the capability to apply a resonant force to the road surface in order to dynamically excite the bridge at its resonant frequency.

Visual index

See also

 Air draft
 Architectural engineering
 Bridge chapel
 Bridge tower
 Bridge to nowhere
 Bridges Act
 BS 5400
 Causeway
 Coal trestle
 Covered bridges
 Cross-sea traffic ways
 Culvert
 Deck
 Devil's Bridge
 Footbridge
 Jet bridge
 Landscape architecture
 Megaproject
 Military bridges
 Orphan bridge
 Outline of bridges
 Overpass
 Pontoon bridge
 Rigid-frame bridge
 Structure gauge
 Transporter bridge
 Tensegrity
 Trestle bridge
 Tunnel

References

Further reading
 Bagher Shemirani, Alireza. Experimental and numerical studies of concrete bridge decks using ultra high-performance concrete and reinforced concrete. Computers and Concrete, 29(6), p. 407-418, 2022. 
 Brown, David J. Bridges: Three Thousand Years of Defying Nature. Richmond Hill, Ont: Firefly Books, 2005. .
 Sandak, Cass R. Bridges. An Easy-read modern wonders book. New York: F. Watts, 1983. .
 Whitney, Charles S. Bridges of the World: Their Design and Construction. Mineola, NY: Dover Publications, 2003.  (Unabridged republication of Bridges : a study in their art, science, and evolution. 1929.)

External links

 Digital Bridge: Bridges of the Nineteenth Century, a collection of digitized books at Lehigh University
 Structurae – International Database and Gallery of Engineerings Structures with over 10000 Bridges.
 U.S. Federal Highway Administration Bridge Technology
 The Museum of Japanese Timber Bridges  Fukuoka University
 "bridge-info.org": site for bridges

Articles containing video clips
 
Infrastructure
Structural engineering